Nabil Gabol is a Pakistani politician who was a member of the National Assembly of Pakistan from 2002 to 2015 and a member of the Provincial Assembly of Sindh from 1988 to 1990 and again from 1993 to 1996. He served as Minister of State for Ports and Shipping from 2008 to 2011 and as Deputy Speaker of the Sindh Assembly from 1993 to 1996. Additionally, he’s the incumbent Chief Sardar (Nawab) of the Gabol, baloch tribe.

Political career

Nabil Gabol is the scion of the oldest political family of Karachi which has remained active since the 1920s. His grandfather, Allah Buksh Gabol was the first Deputy Speaker of the Sindh Assembly and twice elected Mayor of Karachi. His uncle Abdul Sattar Gabol was twice MNA and a former Federal Minister in the 1970s.

He was elected to the Provincial Assembly of Sindh as a candidate of Pakistan Peoples Party (PPP) from Constituency PS-85 (Karachi South-I) in Pakistani general election, 1988. He received 29,247 votes and defeated Khawaja Gulzar Nadeem, a candidate of Islami Jamhoori Ittehad (IJI).

He was re-elected to the Provincial Assembly of Sindh as a candidate of PPP from Constituency PS-88 (Karachi South-IV) in Pakistani general election, 1993. He received 21,587 votes and defeated Muhammad Aslam, a candidate of Haq Parast Group (HPG). He served as Deputy Speaker of the Provincial Assembly of Sindh  from October 1993 to November 1996. As Deputy Speaker he was welcomed to the United States in the Illinois State Assembly and lauded for his democratic endeavors.

He ran for the seat of the Provincial Assembly of Sindh as a candidate of PPP from Constituency PS-88 (Karachi South-IV) in Pakistani general election, 1997 but was unsuccessful. He received 11,968 votes and lost the seat to Liaquat Ali Qureshi, a candidate of HPG. In this election the PPP was wiped out from Punjab and could not even form the government in Sindh amid wide allegations of manipulation of the elections.

He was elected to the National Assembly as a candidate of PPP from Constituency NA-248 (Karachi-X) in Pakistani general election, 2002. He received 32,424 votes and defeated Naseer Uddin Swati, a candidate of Muttahida Majlis-e-Amal (MMA).

He was re-elected to the National Assembly as a candidate of PPP from Constituency NA-248 (Karachi-X) in Pakistani general election, 2008. He received 84,217 votes and defeated Abdul Shakoor Shad. In November 2008, he was inducted into the federal cabinet of Prime Minister Yousaf Raza Gillani and was appointed as Minister of State for Ports and Shipping. He served as Minister of State for Ports and Shipping until February 2011. In December 2008 he inaugurated the Gwadar port. In March 2013, he quit PPP and joined Muttahida Qaumi Movement (MQM).

He was re-elected to the National Assembly as a candidate of MQM from Constituency NA-246 (Karachi-VIII) in Pakistani general election, 2013. He received 137,874 votes and defeated Amir Sharjeel, a candidate of Pakistan Tehreek-e-Insaf (PTI). 
In February 2015, he quit MQM and resigned from his National Assembly seat. In February 2017, He rejoined PPP along with his son Nadir.

References

Living people
Baloch politicians
Government of Yousaf Raza Gillani
Muttahida Qaumi Movement MNAs
People from Lyari Town
Pakistani MNAs 2013–2018
Pakistani MNAs 2002–2007
Pakistani MNAs 2008–2013
Sindh MPAs 1988–1990
Sindh MPAs 1993–1996
Pakistan People's Party MPAs (Sindh)
Pakistan People's Party politicians
Deputy Speakers of the Provincial Assembly of Sindh
Year of birth missing (living people)